refers to a Japanese idol group franchise that began with Nogizaka46, an "official" rival group of AKB48. It currently consists of four groups: Nogizaka46, Sakurazaka46, Hinatazaka46, and Yoshimotozaka46. Despite the name, the groups are not required to have exactly 46 members. Except for Yoshimotozaka46, all the groups were named after real streets in Minato, Tokyo and have all-female memberships.

History

The first group, Nogizaka46, was formed on August 22, 2011 with 36 members and released their debut single "Guruguru Curtain" on February 22, 2012.

The second group, and Nogizaka46's first sister group, Keyakizaka46, was created on August 21, 2015 with 22 members. It was initially named Toriizaka46 before it was changed for unspecified reasons. They released their first single "Silent Majority" on April 6, 2016. A subgroup named Hiragana Keyakizaka46 was created shortly after with 12 members.

On February 21, 2018, Yoshimotozaka46 was announced as the third group in the franchise and 46 members passed the final audition on August 20. Unlike the other groups, it has both male and female members of various ages and most members are comedians affiliated with the Osaka-based talent agency Yoshimoto Kogyo, which also manages the idol group NMB48 and the Produce 101 Japan group JO1. They released their first single, "Nakasete Kure yo", on December 26, 2018.

On February 11, 2019, Hiragana Keyakizaka46 became independent and changed its name to Hinatazaka46, thus becoming the fourth group in the franchise. They released their debut single, "Kyun", on March 27, 2019. On July 16, 2020, it was announced that Keyakizaka46 would also be rebranded into Sakurazaka46, which came into effect on October 14.

In the summer of 2018, a joint Sakamichi Audition was held for the all-female groups and 36 of those who auditioned were accepted. Of the 36, 21 were immediately accepted into either Nogizaka46 (11), Keyakizaka46 (9), and Hiragana Keyakizaka46 (1), while the remaining fifteen were grouped as the trainee group  in 2019. One trainee dropped out and the fourteen remaining ones were assigned to the three groups on February 16, 2020, with five going to Nogizaka46, six going to Sakurazaka46, and three going to Hinatazaka46.

Cinemas Plus positively commented on its production values and the members' performances, and highly recommended the drama even for non-fans of the Sakamichi Series.

Current groups

Parodies
WACK debuted a one-off shuffle unit named  consisting of every idol under the company at the time, they released the single, on June 16, 2021.

References 

 
Musical collectives